Supremacism is the belief that a certain group of people is superior to all others. The supposed superior people can be defined by age, gender, race, ethnicity, religion, sexual orientation, language, social class, ideology, nation, culture, or belong to any other part of a particular population.

Sexual 

Some feminist theorists have argued that in patriarchy, a standard of male "supremacism" is enforced through a variety of cultural, political, religious, sexual, and interpersonal strategies. Since the 19th century there have been a number of feminist movements opposed to male supremacism, usually aimed at achieving equal legal rights and protections for women in all cultural, political and interpersonal relations.

Racial

Centuries of European colonialism in the Americas, Africa, Australia, Oceania, and Asia were justified by white supremacist attitudes. White European Americans who participated in the slave industry tried to justify their economic exploitation of black people by creating a "scientific" theory of white superiority and black inferiority. Thomas Jefferson, pioneer of scientific racism and enslaver of over 600 black people (regarded as property under the Articles of Confederation), wrote that blacks were "inferior to the whites in the endowments of body and mind." A justification for the conquest and subjugation of Native Americans emanated from their dehumanized perception as "merciless Indian savages", as described in the United States Declaration of Independence. 

During the 19th century, "The White Man's Burden", the phrase which refers to the thought that whites have the obligation to make the societies of the other peoples more 'civilized', was widely used to justify imperialist policies as a noble enterprise. Thomas Carlyle, known for his historical account of the French Revolution, The French Revolution: A History, argued that European supremacist policies were justified on the grounds that they provided the greatest benefit to "inferior" native peoples. However, even at the time of its publication in 1849, Carlyle's main work on the subject, the Occasional Discourse on the Negro Question, was poorly received by his contemporaries.

Before the outbreak of the American Civil War, the Confederate States of America was founded with a constitution that contained clauses which restricted the government's ability to limit or interfere with the institution of "negro" slavery. In the Cornerstone Speech, Confederate vice president Alexander Stephens declared that one of the Confederacy's foundational tenets was white supremacy over black slaves. Following the war, a secret society, the Ku Klux Klan, was formed in the South. Its purpose was to maintain white, Protestant supremacy after the Reconstruction period, which it did so through violence and intimidation.

According to William Nichols, religious antisemitism can be distinguished from modern antisemitism which is based on racial or ethnic grounds. "The dividing line was the possibility of effective conversion ... a Jew ceased to be a Jew upon baptism." However, with racial antisemitism, "Now the assimilated Jew was still a Jew, even after baptism ... . From the Enlightenment onward, it is no longer possible to draw clear lines of distinction between religious and racial forms of hostility towards Jews... Once Jews have been emancipated and secular thinking makes its appearance, without leaving behind the old Christian hostility towards Jews, the new term antisemitism becomes almost unavoidable, even before explicitly racist doctrines appear."

One of the first typologies which was used to classify various human races was invented by Georges Vacher de Lapouge (1854–1936), a theoretician of eugenics, who published L'Aryen et son rôle social (1899 – "The Aryan and his social role") in 1899. In his book, he divides humanity into various, hierarchical races, starting with the highest race which is the "Aryan white race, dolichocephalic", and ending with the lowest race which is the "brachycephalic", "mediocre and inert" race, that race is best represented by Southern European, Catholic peasants". Between these, Vacher de Lapouge identified the "Homo europaeus" (Teutonic, Protestant, etc.), the "Homo alpinus" (Auvergnat, Turkish, etc.), and finally the "Homo mediterraneus" (Neapolitan, Andalus, etc.) Jews were brachycephalic just like the Aryans were, according to Lapouge; but he considered them dangerous for this exact reason; they were the only group, he thought, which was threatening to displace the Aryan aristocracy. Vacher de Lapouge became one of the leading inspirations of Nazi antisemitism and Nazi racist ideology.

The Anti-Defamation League (ADL) and Southern Poverty Law Center condemn writings about "Jewish Supremacism" by Holocaust-denier, former Grand Wizard of the KKK, and conspiracy theorist David Duke as antisemitic – in particular, his book Jewish Supremacism: My Awakening to the Jewish Question. Kevin B. MacDonald, known for his theory of Judaism as a "group evolutionary strategy", has also been accused of being "antisemitic" and white supremacist in his writings on the subject by the ADL and his own university psychology department.

Cornel West, an African-American philosopher, writes that black supremacist religious views arose in America as a part of black Muslim theology in response to white supremacism.

In Africa, black Southern Sudanese allege that they are being subjected to a racist form of Arab supremacy, which they equate with the historic white supremacism of South African apartheid. The alleged genocide and ethnic cleansing in the ongoing War in Darfur has been described as an example of Arab racism.
For example, in their analysis of the sources of the conflict, Julie Flint and Alex de Waal say that Colonel Gaddafi, the leader of Libya, sponsored "Arab supremacism" across the Sahara during the 1970s. Gaddafi supported the "Islamic Legion" and the Sudanese opposition "National Front, including the Muslim Brothers and the Ansar, the Umma Party's military wing." Gaddafi tried to use such forces to annex Chad from 1979–81. Gaddafi supported the Sudanese government's war in the South during the early 1980s, and in return, he was allowed to use the Darfur region as a "back door to Chad". As a result, the first signs of an "Arab racist political platform" appeared in Darfur in the early 1980s.

In Asia, ancient Indians considered all foreigners barbarians. The Muslim scholar Al-Biruni wrote that the Indians called foreigners impure. A few centuries later, Dubois observes that "Hindus look upon Europeans as barbarians totally ignorant of all principles of honour and good breeding... In the eyes of a Hindu, a Pariah (outcaste) and a European are on the same level." The Chinese considered the Europeans repulsive, ghost-like creatures, and they even considered them devils. Chinese writers also referred to foreigners as barbarians.

Nazi Germany 

From 1933 to 1945, Nazi Germany, under the rule of Adolf Hitler, promoted the idea of a superior, Aryan Herrenvolk, or master race. The state's propaganda advocated the belief that Germanic peoples, whom they called "Aryans", were a master race or a Herrenvolk whose members were superior to the Jews, Slavs, and Romani people, so-called "gypsies". Arthur de Gobineau, a French racial theorist and aristocrat, blamed the fall of the ancien régime in France on racial intermixing, which he believed had destroyed the purity of the Nordic race. Gobineau's theories, which attracted a large and strong following in Germany, emphasized the existence of an irreconcilable polarity between Aryan and Jewish cultures.

Religious

Christian

Academics Carol Lansing and Edward D. English argue that Christian supremacism was a motivation for the Crusades in the Holy Land, as well as crusades against Muslims and pagans throughout Europe. The blood libel is a widespread European conspiracy theory which led to centuries of pogroms and massacres of European Jewish minorities because it alleged that Jews required the pure blood of a Christian child in order to make matzah for Passover; Thomas of Cantimpré writes of the blood curse which the Jews put upon themselves and all of their generations at the court of Pontius Pilate where Jesus was handed a death sentence: "A very learned Jew, who in our day has been converted to the (Christian) faith, informs us that one enjoying the reputation of a prophet among them, toward the close of his life, made the following prediction: 'Be assured that relief from this secret ailment, to which you are exposed, can only be obtained through Christian blood ("solo sanguine Christiano")." The Atlantic slave trade has also been partially attributed to Christian supremacism. The Ku Klux Klan has been described as a white supremacist Christian organization, as are many other white supremacist groups, such as the Posse Comitatus and the Christian Identity and Positive Christianity movements.

Islamic

Academics Khaled Abou El Fadl, Ian Lague, and Joshua Cone note that, while the Quran and other Islamic scriptures express tolerant beliefs, there have also been numerous instances of Muslim or Islamic supremacism. Examples of how supremacists have interpreted Islam include the Muslim participation in the African slave trade, the early-20th-century pan-Islamism promoted by Abdul Hamid II, the jizya and rules of marriage in Muslim countries being imposed on non-Muslims, and the majority Muslim interpretations of the rules of pluralism in Malaysia. According to scholar Bernard Lewis, classical Islamic jurisprudence imposes an open-ended duty on Muslims to expand Muslim rule and Islamic law to all non-Muslims throughout the world.

North Africa has witnessed numerous incidents of massacres and ethnic cleansing of Jews and Christians, especially in Morocco, Libya, and Algeria, where eventually Jews were forced to live in ghettos. Decrees ordering the destruction of synagogues were enacted during the Middle Ages in Egypt, Syria, Iraq, and Yemen. At certain times in Yemen, Morocco, and Baghdad, Jews were forced to convert to Islam or face the Islamic death penalty. While there were antisemitic incidents before the 20th century, antisemitism increased dramatically as a result of the Arab–Israeli conflict. After the 1948 Arab–Israeli War, the Palestinian exodus, the creation of the State of Israel and Israeli victories during the wars of 1956 and 1967 were a severe humiliation to Israel's opponentsprimarily Egypt, Syria, and Iraq. However, by the mid-1970s the vast majority of Jews had left Muslim-majority countries, moving primarily to Israel, France, and the United States. The reasons for the Jewish exodus are varied and disputed.

Jewish

Ilan Pappé, an expatriate Israeli historian, writes that the First Aliyah to Israel "established a society based on Jewish supremacy" within "settlement-cooperatives" that were Jewish owned and operated. Joseph Massad, a professor of Arab studies, holds that "Jewish supremacism" has always been a "dominating principle" in religious and secular Zionism. Zionism was established with the political goal of creating a sovereign Jewish state where Jews could be the majority, rather than the minority which they were in all nations of the world at that time. Theodor Herzl, the ideological father of Zionism, considered antisemitism to be an eternal feature of all societies in which Jews lived as minorities, and as a result, he believed that only a separation could allow Jews to escape eternal persecution. "Let them give us sovereignty over a piece of the Earth's surface, just sufficient for the needs of our people, then we will do the rest!"

Since the 1990s, Orthodox Jewish rabbis from Israel, most notably those affiliated to Chabad-Lubavitch and religious Zionist organizations, including The Temple Institute, have set up a modern Noahide movement. These Noahide organizations, led by religious Zionist and Orthodox rabbis, are aimed at non-Jews in order to convince them to commit to follow the Noahide laws. However, these religious Zionist and Orthodox rabbis that guide the modern Noahide movement, who are often affiliated with the Third Temple movement, expound a racist and supremacist ideology which consists in the belief that the Jewish people are God's chosen nation and racially superior to non-Jews, and mentor Noahides because they believe that the Messianic era will begin with the rebuilding of the Third Temple on the Temple Mount in Jerusalem to re-institute the Jewish priesthood along with the practice of ritual sacrifices, and the establishment of a Jewish theocracy in Israel, supported by communities of Noahides. David Novak, professor of Jewish theology and ethics at the University of Toronto, has denounced the modern Noahide movement by stating that "If Jews are telling Gentiles what to do, it’s a form of imperialism".

In the aftermath of the 2022 Israeli legislative election, the winning right-wing coalition included an alliance known as Religious Zionist Party—a grouping of the Religious Zionist, Otzma Yehudit, and Noam parties. Within the context of the 2019–2022 Israeli political crisis, this was the fifth legislative election in nearly four years, as no party since 2019 had been able to form a stable coalition. Jewish-American columnist David E. Rosenberg has stated that the Religious Zionist Party's "platform includes things like annexation of West Bank settlements, expulsion of asylum-seekers, and political control of the judicial system". He further described the Religious Zionist Party as a political party "driven by Jewish supremacy and anti-Arab racism".

See also 

 Ableism
 Anthropocentrism
 Chauvinism
 Classicide
 Class discrimination
 Colonialism
 Cultural hegemony
 Cultural imperialism
 Discrimination
 Discrimination based on skin color
 Elitism
 Ethnic cleansing
 Ethnic conflict
 Ethnocentrism
 Ethnocide
 Eugenics
 Exceptionalism
 Far-right politics
 Fascism
 Geneticism
 Genocide
 Hegemonic masculinity
 Hegemony
 Height discrimination
 Heteronormativity
 Homophobia
 Jingoism
 Imperialism
 Lookism
 Machismo
 Might makes right
 Nationalism
 Nativism (politics)
 Persecution
 Pluralism
 Racism
 Rankism
 Religious discrimination
 Religious fanaticism
 Religious intolerance
 Religious nationalism
 Religious persecution
 Religious segregation
 Religious terrorism
 Religious violence
 Religious war
 Right-wing politics
 Scientific racism
 Sizeism
 Slavery
 Social Darwinism
 Sexism
 Snob
 Speciesism
 Technological supremacy
 Terrorism
 Xenophobia

Notes

 
Ethnic supremacy
Narcissism
Political theories
Prejudice and discrimination
Racism